Collision frequency describes the rate of collisions  between two atomic or molecular species in a given volume, per unit time. In an ideal gas, assuming that the species behave like hard spheres, the collision frequency between entities of species A and species B is:  

 
SI unit of Z is the volumetric collision rate (unit m3⋅s−1).

where: 
  is the number of A molecules in the gas,
  is the number of B molecules in the gas,
  is the Boltzmann constant (unit m2⋅kg⋅s−2⋅K−1),
  is the temperature (unit K),
  is the reduced mass of the reactants A and B,  (unit kg)

Collision in diluted solution 
Collision in diluted gas or liquid solution is regulated by diffusion instead of direct collisions, which can be calculated from Fick's laws of diffusion.

 

Where:

  is the Boltzmann constant
  is the absolute temperature (unit K)
  is the viscosity of the solution (pascal seconds)
  is the concentration of particles per cm3

Here the frequency is independent of particle size, a result noted as counter-intuitive. For particles of different size, more elaborate expressions can be derived for estimating .

References

Chemical kinetics